Abdullah Abdurahman Al-Battat (Arabic:عبد الله البطاط) (born 3 January 1988) is a Qatari born-Palestinian former professional footballer.

International career
Al-Battat was born in Qatar and is of Palestinian descent. He has represented the Qatar national football team in a friendly 1-0 loss to North Korea on 30 December 2009.

External links
 
 NFT Profile

References

1988 births
Living people
Qatari footballers
Qatar international footballers
Palestinian emigrants to Qatar
Qatari people of Palestinian descent
Naturalised citizens of Qatar
Al Kharaitiyat SC players
Muaither SC players
Al-Khor SC players
Qatar Stars League players
Qatari Second Division players
Association football midfielders
Place of birth missing (living people)